Ichneutica blenheimensis is a species of moth in the family Noctuidae. It is endemic to New Zealand and is found throughout the North, South and the Stewart Islands. This species appears to prefer drier eastern localities and is rarely collected in western North Island forested areas. The host plant for the larvae of this species is likely to be the golden sand sedge pīngao which is now absent from the moths type locality. However Chappell has raised very young larvae on grass species and the more developed larvae consumed Phormium tenax. Adults are on the wing from November to March and are attracted to both light and sugar traps. The blackish forewing fringes are diagnostic of this species. But worn specimens of I. arotis can be confused with worn specimens of I. blenheimensis. However I. arotis can be distinguished from I. blenheimensis as it has a scale-tuft on the thorax and dark longitudinal stripes on the tegula. This species is classified as "At Risk, Naturally Uncommon" by the Department of Conservation.

Taxonomy 

This species was described by Richard William Fereday in 1883 using a female specimen collected by William Skellon in Meanee near Napier. Fereday originally named the species Leucania blenheimensis. In 1887 Edward Meyrick described the male of the species. George Hudson discussed and illustrated this species under this name in both his 1898 and 1928 publications. In 1971 John S. Dugdale transferred all the New Zealand species in the genus Leucania to the genus Tmetolophota. The lectotype specimen is held at the Canterbury Museum.  In 2019 Robert Hoare undertook a major review of New Zealand Noctuidae. During this review the genus Ichneutica was greatly expanded and the genus Tmetolophota was subsumed into that genus as a synonym. As a result of this review, this species is now known as Ichneutica blenheimensis.

Description 
A. V. Chappell described the egg as follows:

A. V. Chappell also described the larva as follows:

Hudson described the adults of this species as follows:
The wingspan of the adult male is between 37 mm and the female wingspan is between 40 and 41 mm. The blackish forewing fringes are diagnostic of this species. Worn specimens of I. arotis can be confused with worn specimens of I. blenheimensis. However I. arotis can be distinguished from I. blenheimensis as it has a scale-tuft on the thorax and dark longitudinal stripes on the tegula.

Distribution 
This species is endemic to New Zealand. It is found throughout the North, South and the Stewart Islands.  The range of this species covers the Hawkes Bay, Marlborough, Dunedin, Otago Lakes, Southland and the Stewart Island regions. Along with the type locality of Meanee, specimens have also been collected at the Denniston plateau, Blenheim, Dunedin, Lake Wakatipu and Routeburn.

Biology and behaviour 
This species is on the wing from November to March. It has been collected via sugar traps and is attracted to light.

Host species and habitat 
The host plant for the larvae of this species is likely to be the golden sand sedge pīngao which is now absent from the moths type locality.  Chappell states very young larvae eat grass species but more developed larvae consumed Phormium tenax. Based on collections this species appears to prefer drier eastern localities and is rarely collected in western North Island forested areas. It does not appear to be frequently collected in dry inland tussock grassland habitats.

Conservation Status 
This species has been classified as having the "At Risk, Naturally Uncommon" conservation status under the New Zealand Threat Classification System.

References

Moths described in 1883
Moths of New Zealand
Hadeninae
Endemic fauna of New Zealand
Endangered biota of New Zealand
Endemic moths of New Zealand